Heather Crowe (April 23, 1945, Yarmouth, Nova Scotia – May 22, 2006, Ottawa, Ontario) was a Canadian waitress who became the public face of Canada's anti-smoking campaign.

Crowe was diagnosed with lung cancer in 2002. Famously claiming to have "never smoked a day in her life", Crowe believed her cancer to be the result of regularly breathing second-hand smoke at her workplace, Moe's Newport Restaurant, for over forty years. In 2002, she submitted a successful claim related to second-hand smoke exposure in the workplace to the Ontario Workplace Safety & Insurance Board for lost earnings and health care benefits.  Based on her $12,000 salary, WSIB awarded her $200 a week, $4,000 a year to help with medical expenses and a one-time payment of $40,000 for pain and suffering.

Shortly before Christmas, 2003, WSIB ordered the 59-year-old Crowe, still undergoing chemotherapy and radiation therapy, back to work.

Following Crowe's lobbying campaign, the province of Ontario passed an anti-smoking bill which banned smoking in all indoor public spaces and near the entrances of government buildings. The law came into effect four days after Crowe's death in 2006. She was survived by her daughter, whom she raised alone.

See also
 Barb Tarbox

References

External links
Ottawa Mourns; National Post
Heather Crowe Campaign (Physicians for a Smoke-Free Canada)

1945 births
2006 deaths
Canadian activists
Canadian people of Ulster-Scottish descent
Deaths from cancer in Ontario
Deaths from lung cancer
People from Ottawa
People from Yarmouth, Nova Scotia
Restaurant staff
Smoking in Canada
Canadian women activists